Insane is a roller coaster at Gröna Lund in Stockholm. Insane is an Intamin Zac-Spin roller coaster. It opened in 2009. The train cars contain 4 seats with 2 on each side. When navigating the course, the trains are free to spin and flip. In 2011, a similar roller coaster, Green Lantern: First Flight, opened at Six Flags Magic Mountain.

After the deadly incident on Inferno at Terra Mítica in Benidorm, Spain on 7 July 2014, and because the two rides share several similarities, Gröna Lund had ceased running Insane for several days before reopening the coaster.

References

Roller coasters in Sweden
Roller coasters introduced in 2009
Gröna Lund